Mark Edward Dailey (August 1, 1953 – December 6, 2010) was an American-born Canadian television journalist and announcer. He was the host of 11 p.m. weeknight CityNews newscasts in Toronto, Ontario, and a prominent continuity announcer voicing interstitial program announcements on CITY-TV.

Career
Dailey was born and raised in Youngstown, Ohio, to parents John and Rose-Marie (Genetta) Dailey and was one of three children (sisters Kathleen and Colleen). Dailey graduated from Ursuline High School and then studied law enforcement at Youngstown State University, in Ohio, worked as a state trooper in the Ohio State Highway Patrol, and became a crime reporter for stations in Ohio (first at WNIO/1540 AM - now known as WYOH - and then ABC affiliate WYTV in the late 1960s) and at radio station CKLW in Windsor, Ontario before moving to Toronto in 1974. Prior to Citytv, Dailey worked at Q-107 and CHUM-AM and FM. Dailey worked at Citytv for 31 years.  He was well-known for voicing the station's slogan: "This is Citytv, Everywhere!".

Acting
As a voice actor, Dailey voiced characters in the animated series Medabots, The Ripping Friends, Beyblade, Grossology, My Dad the Rock Star, Spliced, and others like Rescue Heroes and Storm Hawks.  He also appeared (as a news reporter) in several Canadian films including Nicholas Campbell's Boozecan (1994), Claire's Hat, The Life Before This, and Childstar. He did voiceover work for one season of the Fishn' Canada Show (1999), and Magavision (1999) outdoor video newsletter''.

Dailey is widely credited with delivering the title line during the chorus of the 1982 Rush song "Subdivisions", although he denied this. Neil Peart, who was the drummer of Rush, was actually the person who voiced "Subdivisions" in the chorus of the song.

Death
Dailey survived prostate cancer but announced during his 11p.m. newscast on September 9, 2010 that he had been diagnosed with kidney cancer. The cancer spread to his lungs and he died on December 6, 2010 at Sunnybrook Health Sciences Centre. He was 57 years old.

References

External links

1953 births
2010 deaths
American expatriates in Canada
American emigrants to Canada
American state police officers
Canadian male voice actors
Male actors from Toronto
Radio and television announcers
People from Youngstown, Ohio
Canadian television news anchors
Youngstown State University alumni
Deaths from kidney cancer
Deaths from cancer in Ontario
Ohio State Highway Patrol
Citytv people